Paolo Odogwu (born 18 February 1997) is an English professional rugby union player who plays as a winger for Stade Français in the Top 14. In 2019, Paolo became the Premiership Rugby 7's All-time top try scorer.

Rugby career
After playing many positions at age grade level for King Edward's School Birmingham and Walsall RFC including prop, and number 8; Odogwu was deemed "too fast" to be a forward and focused his talent in the centres and on the wing.

Odogwu spent his academy years at Leicester Tigers, scoring a memorable try in Marcos Ayerza's testimonial match at Welford Road, beating three players from the halfway line to score in the corner. He was released by Leicester in the summer of 2016 and signed for Sale Sharks.

Sale Sharks
Odogwu rose to fame after his performances for Sale in the Aviva Premiership Singha 7s tournament, scoring 8 tries in the group stage, breaking the record of 7 set by Christian Wade the previous year. This earned him the man of the round award.

In September 2016 Odogwu made his senior debut for Sale in the second round of the Premiership season against Harlequins, impressing onlookers with footwork, pace and power. The following month saw him score his first try for the club against former side Leicester in round 5.

Odogwu left Sale at the end of the 2018–19 season after spending 3 seasons at the club and making 29 first team appearances, signing for Coventry-based club Wasps.

Wasps
Odogwu scored 6 tries for Wasps at the 2019 Premiership 7s, helping the team reach the final in what was his first outing for the club. Odogwu was banned for 6 weeks in November 2019 after making contact with the head of Sale Sharks player Rohan Janse van Rensburg with his boot whilst fielding a high kick.

He scored his first tries for the club in round 2 of the 2020-21 Premiership season against Gloucester; finding his way over the tryline twice in the last 2 minutes of the game to help Wasps to a try bonus point. After some excellent form in late 2020 and early 2021 Odogwu earned his first man of the match award in a thrilling 44–52 victory away to Bath.

Odogwu was made redundant along with every other Wasps player and coach when the team entered administration on 17 October 2022.

Stade Français
On 27 October 2022 it was confirmed that Odogwu had signed for French Top 14 side Stade Français.

International 
Odogwu, who is of Nigerian and Italian descent, represented England under 18's. He then played for England U20 in the 2016 Six Nations Under 20s Championship and came off the bench in the final of the 2017 World Rugby Under 20 Championship as England finished runners up to New Zealand. In January 2021 he was called into the England Senior Test team for the 2021 Six Nations.

External links
ESPN profile

References 

1997 births
Living people
English rugby union players
Rugby union players from Coventry
Leicester Tigers players
Sale Sharks players
Wasps RFC players
Rugby union wings
People educated at King Edward's School, Birmingham
People educated at Leicester Grammar School
Black British sportspeople
English people of Nigerian descent
English people of Italian descent
Italian British rugby union players